El-Sayed Mohamed Kandil (1917 – 28 January 2000) was an Egyptian wrestler. He competed in the men's Greco-Roman featherweight at the 1948 Summer Olympics.

References

External links
 

1917 births
2000 deaths
Egyptian male sport wrestlers
Olympic wrestlers of Egypt
Wrestlers at the 1948 Summer Olympics
Place of birth missing
20th-century Egyptian people